Turgo is a small basaltic hill on the southern slopes of Mount Merapi, Indonesia, and is also known as Gunung Turgo or Mount Turgo. It is administratively located in Purwobinangun, Pakem, Sleman Regency, Special Region of Yogyakarta. Recent work suggests that the hill itself is older than the present volcanic cone of Gunung Merapi. It is just west of Plawangan, the valley between the two has been subject to nuée ardente in the 1990s which killed local villagers.

Despite the very small area on the peak of Turgo, it has some sacred graves that are attributed to be connected with Sheikh Jumadil Qubro, a direct descendant of the Islamic prophet, Muhammad, and as consequence is considered to be part of the complex network of graves that constitute the Javanese sacred places
Dutch anthropologist Martin van Bruinessen has written about this character following his residence in Yogyakarta.

It is also located within the Plawangan Turgo nature reserve, a  nature reserve on the slope of Merapi that has rare animals and plants occurring in its area.

References

External links
  Context from 1994 eruption of Merapi

Mountains of Indonesia
Sleman Regency
Mount Merapi